The Kabuscorp De Laguna Football Club or Kabuscorp De Laguna FC is an association football club based in the Laguna, Philippines. They played in the Second Division of the United Football League first featuring in the 2015 season.

Zeferino Fielda Silva and Angel Chan was behind the conception of the football club.

See also
Kabuscorp Sport Clube do Palanca-a related sporting club in Angola.

References

External links

Football clubs in the Philippines
Sports in Laguna (province)
Defunct football clubs in the Philippines